Provincial city, commonly known as City, a type of second tier subdivision of Vietnam is divided into 713 units along with urban district, district, municipal city, and town have equal status. Also by virtue of Decree No. 42/2009/ND-CP, city are officially classified into Class-1, Class-2 or Class-3.

The cities can only subordinate to Province as the Second Tier unit. At the Third Tier, City is divided into wards and communes.

Fact
Cities are usually provincial urban and administrative centers. Some cities also was appointed provincial economic centers and the culture center of a region (between provinces). There might still agricultural population in the suburban of provincial cities. Provincial cities are divided into wards (within the inner city) and communes (within the suburban). Cities are equal level with counties, urban districts or towns, but larger and more important. At the time of 2020, seven cities: Bắc Ninh, Dĩ An, Đông Hà, Huế, Sóc Trăng, Thủ Dầu Một and Vĩnh Long, do not have any rural commune.

List of provincial cities

See also
 List of cities in Vietnam

References

Vietnam 1
Provinces
Subdivisions of Vietnam